The 3rd National Congress of the Chinese Communist Party was held in Guangzhou at 31 Xuguyuan Road between June 12 and June 20, 1923. It succeeded the 2nd National Congress of the Chinese Communist Party and preceded the 4th National Congress of the Chinese Communist Party. The congress was attended by 40 representatives across China and Moscow representing 420 party members of the Chinese Communist Party (CCP).

The congress was hosted by Chen Duxiu, with participation from Li Dazhao, Zhang Guotao, Tan Pingshan, Cai Hesen, Chen Tanqiu, Luo Zhanglong, and Henk Sneevliet (representing the Comintern). Sneevilet briefed congress regarding the inquiries by the Comintern related to the cooperation between the CCP and Kuomintang. The congress held elections to appoint members in the 3rd Central Executive Committee of the Chinese Communist Party and drafted resolutions of the 3rd Congress.

Agenda 
In early-June 1923, Mao Zedong, along with Zhu Shaolian, represented the party division at Zhengxiang and left Shanghai for Guangzhou to attend the event. There were three main agendas discussed and implemented in the congress:

 Drafting of the party manifesto;
 Cooperation with the Kuomintang towards reunification, and;
 An election to form the 3rd Central Executive Committee of the Chinese Communist Party.

The main agenda involved relates to the cooperation between the CCP and the Kuomintang, to discuss issues on the reunification of the Republic. This matter was highlighted by a report from Chen Duxiu. Mao Zedong made a speech in the congress about workers' movements at Hunan. Congress passed the National Movement and Kuomintang Question Act, allowing CCP members to join the Kuomintang, while maintaining efforts to expand the CCP itself. Congess also elected 9 members and 5 backup-members of the 3rd Central Executive Committee of the CCP.

The Central Committee elected Chen, Mao, Luo Zhanglong, Cai Hesen, and Tan Pingshan to form the Central Committee of the CCP. Chen was nominated as the President, while Mao was elected as Secretary. Congress also passed the Chinese Communist Party Central Committee Organisation Act, ruling that "the Secretary is responsible for all documentations, paperwork, communications, and meeting records of the political party. All party documents must be signed by the President and the Secretary of the CCP." Congress was dismissed when representatives sang The Internationale at the Martyr's Tomb of the Huanghuagang Park. After congress ended, Mao, Chen, Li and Xiang Jingyu remained at Guangzhou.

Impact 
Congress, in accordance to instructions sent from Comintern, officially confirmed that CCP members are allowed to join Kuomintang, solidifying the cooperation between the CCP and KMT.

After congress, under the promotion by the CCP, Sun Yat-sen reformed the Kuomintang, validating the policies discussed within the Congress, leading to the formation of the 1st National Congress of the Kuomintang in 1924, where CCP-Kuomintang cooperation was formally established.

Since the 3rd Congress，it became standard for The Internationale to be played in the closing ceremonies of each National Congress held by the CCP.

References

External links 

 中共三大会址纪念馆（官方网站）
 中国共产党第三次全国大会宣言 
 中国共产党第一次修正章程 

1923 conferences
1923 in China
National Congress of the Chinese Communist Party